Lac d'Orédon is a lake raised by a dam in Hautes-Pyrénées, France. At an elevation of 1849 m, its surface area is 0.46 km².

It was one of the first lakes of the Pyrenees to have been built in the 17th century.

Public Use 
In 1864, the Ministry of Agriculture decided to increase and regulate the flow of the Neste canal (feeding Gers rivers) using the lakes of the upper valley of Aure (Aubert, Aumar, Cap-de -Long, Lac d'Orédon). The lake was expropriated for public utility in June 1869. Construction of the dam and reservoir was completed in 1884.

References

Lakes of Hautes-Pyrénées